The Livermore-Pleasanton Fire Department (LPFD) provides fire suppression and emergency medical services to the neighboring cities of Livermore and Pleasanton, California. The organization uses a joint powers authority (JPA) model with essential support services provided by both cities. This partnership promotes more efficient administration and effective delivery of services.

Centennial Light

LPFD Station 6 maintains the Centennial Light, the world's longest-lasting light bulb, located at 4550 East Avenue in Livermore. The department says that the bulb is at least 117 years old and has been turned off only a handful of times. Due to its longevity, the bulb has been noted by The Guinness Book of World Records, Ripley's Believe It or Not!, and General Electric.

USAR Task Force 4

The LPFD has multiple members in the California USAR Task Force 4 (CA-TF4) one of the eight FEMA Urban Search and Rescue Task Forces in the state. The task force is based in Oakland and is sponsored by the Oakland Fire Department.

Stations and apparatus
The Livermore-Pleasanton Fire Department has 10 fire stations spread across both Pleasanton and Livermore.

Firefighters Foundation
The Livermore-Pleasanton Firefighters Foundation is a non-profit organization created to support injured and fallen firefighters, police, EMS personnel, and their families both locally and across the state.

Dispatch
Communications and dispatch services are provided by the Alameda County Regional Emergency Communications Center (ACRECC) located at nearby Lawrence Livermore National Laboratory.

References

Fire departments in California
Fire
Fire